Gangi is a perennial river and a tributary of Ganga which mainly flows near the Arrah town of Bihar in India.

History 
It is believed it is the ancient stream of the river Ganga. The high bank of old river bed can still be traced in Bhojpur and Buxar.

Course 
It originates from the mainstream of Ganga in Barahara in Bhojpur district and flows from north east part of Arrah to the south - west part and meets again Ganga in Buxar. The Ara Canal falls into it near Ramsara Chandar Chur.

References

Tributaries of the Ganges
Rivers of Bihar
Arrah